Alberto "Bobby" Dapidran Pacquiao (born April 23, 1980) is a Filipino former professional boxer and elected public official who competed in boxing from 1997 to 2008. He is the younger brother of Manny Pacquiao.

Boxing career
Pacquiao turned professional in 1997. He won the Philippines Games and Amusements Board super featherweight title and defended it four times between 2002 and 2004. On June 17, 2005, in Cabazon, California, he defeated Carlos Navarro for the WBC Continental Americas super-featherweight title by a seventh-round technical knockout (TKO).

On June 10, 2006, he defended his title against former WBC featherweight champion Kevin Kelley.

Before a match held on November 16, 2006, to defend his title against Héctor Velázquez, Pacquiao was stripped of his title for being three pounds over the weight limit. Although the title had already been declared vacant, the fight proceeded as scheduled. During the fight, referee Kenny Bayless warned Pacquiao repeatedly for low blows before disqualifying him in the eleventh round.

He made his lightweight debut on June 9, 2007, where he fought soon-to-be WBC super-featherweight champion Humberto Soto in a ten-round bout. After sustaining a cut that impaired his vision, Pacquiao was knocked out in round seven.

Following three bouts in the lightweight division, he knocked out Decho Bankluaygym in eight rounds on August 2, 2008, for the WBO Asia-Pacific lightweight title.

On November 19, 2008, he lost by unanimous decision to North American Boxing Association champion Robert Frankel in San Jose, California. This was his last bout.

Professional titles
Philippines Games and Amusements Board (GAB) Super Featherweight Title (2002)
WBC Continental Americas Super Featherweight Title (2005)
WBO Asia Pacific Lightweight Title (2008)

Basketball career

MP Gensan Warriors (Liga Pilipinas)
He was included in the 16-man roster that competed in SMART-Liga Pilipinas Conference II. On his debut, he scored only two points in a 63–59 loss to the Ilocos Sur Bravehearts. On January 16, 2009, he scored 10 points in a blowout win against Zamboanga del Norte. He also wanted to play in the Tournament of the Philippines (TOP), the first joint project of Liga Pilipinas and the Philippine Basketball League, but he was instead placed on the reserve list since Manny Pacquiao wanted to suit up for the team.

KIA Motors (PBA)
On May 27, 2014, it was reported that he was among those who tried out for KIA Motors which is coached by his brother Manny Pacquiao. Asked if he would select Bobby, his brother answered that it would be too big of a favor to give. On July 26, 2014, in an interview with Snow Badua, Pacquiao revealed that he would no longer apply for the 2014 PBA draft, focusing instead on a possible stint with the family-supported Countrywide Basketball League (CWBL) franchise.

MP Hotel (PBA D-League)
After the CWBL failed to materialize due to financial difficulties, he was then assigned as the team manager of Manny Pacquiao's PBA D-League franchise. On the team's debut, they were handed a 27-point loss by Cafe France led by Maverick Ahanmisi who had ten points. The team last competed on the 2015 PBA D-League Foundation Cup.

Other leagues
In 2011, he and his brother Manny played for the MP Warriors in the Manny Pacquiao Basketball Cup, which featured teams such as BBEAL champion University of Baguio, runner-up University of the Cordilleras, Cordillera College from La Trinidad, Chesaa 2011 men's basketball champion Baguio College of Technology. On one of the games, he scored 10 points while Manny scored 124. The tournament was staged in the middle of Manny Pacquiao's preparation against Shane Mosley.
In March 2013, his team the MP Warriors, then coached by Arvin Bonleon, won a P300,000 prize after defeating the Celebrity team led by Gerald Anderson.
In 2014, the MP Warriors ruled the Kalilangan Festival Commercial basketball league in February by beating Kadayawan sa Dabaw Invitational Commercial champion Gold Star Davao. Pacquiao's team also finished first runner-up in the Araw ng Dabaw Invitational Open league in March.

Politics
On October 19, 2013, Pacquiao sought a seat in the village council of Labangal, where his wife Lorelei is barangay head. He won and became village councilor of Barangay Labangal. His wife was also re-elected as chairman of the same barangay. He ran under the People's Champ Movement (PCM), a local political party founded by Manny Pacquiao.
In May 2016, he got 95,052 votes and was proclaimed one of the 12 councilors of General Santos.

See also
List of left-handed boxers

References

External links

1980 births
Living people
People from Bukidnon
Featherweight boxers
Filipino Roman Catholics
Sportspeople from General Santos
Boxers from South Cotabato
Basketball players from South Cotabato
Southpaw boxers
Super-bantamweight boxers
Super-featherweight boxers
Filipino male boxers
Bobby
Filipino sportsperson-politicians
Filipino men's basketball coaches
Party-list members of the House of Representatives of the Philippines